Jusepe Martínez Lurbe (1602 in Zaragoza – 1682) was a Spanish painter. He wrote a treatise Discursos practicables del noblisimo arte de la pintura (c.1675, not published until 1866).

References

1602 births
1682 deaths